The 1998 All-Big 12 Conference football team consists of American football players chosen as All-Big 12 Conference players for the 1998 NCAA Division I-A football season.  The conference recognizes two official All-Big 12 selectors: (1) the Big 12 conference coaches selected separate offensive and defensive units and named first-, second- and third-team players (the "Coaches" team); and (2) a panel of sports writers and broadcasters covering the Big 12 also selected offensive and defensive units and named first- and second-team players (the "Media" team).

Offensive selections

Quarterbacks
 Michael Bishop, Kansas State (Coaches-1; Media-1)
 Major Applewhite, Texas (Media-2)
 Corby Jones, Missouri (Coaches-2)

Running backs
 Ricky Williams, Texas (Coaches-1; Media-1)
 Devin West, Missouri (Coaches-1; Media-1)
 Ricky Williams, Texas Tech (Coaches-2; Media-2)
 De'Mond Parker, Oklahoma (Media-2)
 Darren Davis, Iowa State (Media-2)
 Nathan Simmons, Oklahoma State (Coaches-2)

Centers
 Rob Riti, Missouri (Coaches-1; Media-1)
 Josh Heskew, Nebraska (Coaches-1; Media-1)
 Jeremy Offutt, Oklahoma State (Coaches-2)

Guards
 Craig Heimburger, Missouri (Coaches-1; Media-1)
 Ben Adams, Texas (Coaches-2; Media-1)
 Adam Davis, Oklahoma State (Coaches-2; Media-2)
 Curtis Lowery, Texas Tech (Coaches-2; Media-2)

Tackles
 Ryan Young, Kansas State (Coaches-1; Media-1)
 Jay Humphrey, Texas (Coaches-1; Media-2)
 Derrick Fletcher, Baylor (Coaches-2)
 Ryan Johanningmeier, Colorado (Media-2)
 Todd Neimeyer, Missouri (Media-2)

Tight ends
 Sheldon Jackson, Nebraska (Coaches-2; Media-1)
 Derek Lewis, Texas (Coaches-1; Media-2)

Receivers
 Darnell McDonald, Kansas State (Coaches-1; Media-1)
 Wane McGarity, Texas (Coaches-1; Media-1)
 Donnie Hart, Texas Tech, (Coaches-2; Media-2)
 Darin Chiaverini, Colorado, (Coaches-2; Media-2)
 Damien Groce, Iowa State (Coaches-2)

Defensive selections

Defensive linemen
 Kelly Gregg, Oklahoma (Coaches-1; Media-1)
 Casey Hampton, Texas (Coaches-2)
 Darren Howard, Kansas State (Coaches-1; Media-1)
 Aaron Humphrey, Texas (Media-2)
 Chad Kelsay, Nebraska (Coaches-2; Media-2)
 Aaron Marshall, Colorado (Coaches-2)
 Damion McIntosh, Kansas State (Coaches-2)
 Montae Reagor, Texas Tech (Coaches-1; Media-1)
 Mike Rucker, Nebraska (Coaches-2; Media-2)
 Taurus Rucker, Texas Tech (Coaches-1)
 Justin Wyatt, Missouri (Coaches-1)

Linebackers
 Pat Brown, Kansas (Media-2)
 Jay Foreman, Nebraska (Media-2)
 Warrick Holdman, Texas A&M (Media-1)
 Sedric Jones, Oklahoma (Media-2)
 Jeff Kelly, Kansas State (Coaches-1; Media-1)
 Dat Nguyen, Texas A&M (Coaches-1; Media-1)
 Travis Ochs, Kansas State (Media-2)
 Mark Simoneau, Kansas State (Coaches-2; Media-1)
 Kenyatta Wright, Oklahoma State (Coaches-2; Media-2)

Defensive backs
 Gary Baxter, Baylor (Coaches-2; Media-2)
 Mike Brown, Nebraska (Coaches-2; Media-2)
 Ralph Brown, Nebraska, (Coaches-1; Media-1)
 Lamar Chapman, Kansas State (Coaches-1; Media-2)
 Rich Coady, Texas A&M (Media-1)
 Jarrod Cooper, Kansas State (Coaches-1; Media-1)
 Ben Kelly, Colorado (Media-2)
 Wade Perkins, Missouri (Coaches-2; Media-2)
 Harold Piersey, Missouri (Coaches-1; Media-1)
 Ricky Thompson, Oklahoma State (Media-2)
 Jason Webster, Texas A&M (Media-2)
 Mike Woods, Oklahoma (Coaches-2)

Special teams

Kickers
 Martín Gramática, Kansas State (Coaches-1; Media-1)
 Chris Birkholz, Texas Tech (Media-2)
 Kris Brown, Nebraska (Coaches-2)

Punters
 Shane Lechler, Texas A&M (Coaches-1; Media-1)
 Kyle Atteberry, Baylor (Coaches-2; Media-2)

Return specialists
 David Allen, Kansas State (Coaches-1; Media-1)
 Ben Kelly, Colorado (Media-1)
 Joe Walker, Nebraska (Coaches-2; Media-2)

Key
Bold = selected as a first-team player by both the coaches and media panel

Coaches = selected by Big 12 Conference coaches

Media = selected by a media panel

See also
1998 College Football All-America Team

References

All-Big 12 Conference
All-Big 12 Conference football teams